The  is a Japanese professional association of independent leading executives.  Founded in 1948, the group engages in advocacy on public policy issues related to the development of the Japanese economy in both a domestic and global context. The association is commonly referred to as "Keizai Dōyukai".

Keizai Dōyukai conducts in-depth policy studies, publishes position papers, and holds regular meetings and seminars on issues relating to the development of the Japanese economy. The association seeks to engage with political parties, government officials, labour organizations and other economic stakeholders.

For most of the post-war period, Keizai Dōyukai has promoted a more progressive, innovative and market based economic approach to business issues in contrast to the position of country's other main corporate sponsored business associations; Keidanren and the Japan Chamber of Commerce and Industry (日本商工会議所).

Membership
Membership of Keizai Dōyukai is by invitation and is held in an individual capacity independent of corporate affiliation. Its approximately 1,400 members consists of senior executives of 950 Japanese corporations sharing a common belief that corporate managers should be key players in a broad range of political, economic and social issues.

Membership was first extended to women executives in 1986.

Corporate social responsibility
Keizai Dōyukai has a record of advocating that corporate social responsibility be an integral part of responsible business activities, not simply as an issue of legal compliance or discrete charitable giving.

Current Board
Yoshimitsu Kobayashi Chairman of Mitsubishi Chemical Holdings assumed the role of Keizai Dōyukai Chairman in 2015.

See also
Chamber of commerce
List of employer associations

References

Organizations established in 1946
1946 establishments in Japan
Organizations based in Tokyo
Marunouchi
Professional associations based in Japan
Business executives
Employers' organizations in Japan
Business organizations based in Japan
Advocacy groups in Japan